Thomas Crooks was an American football coach.  He was the 11th head football coach at Dickinson College in Carlisle, Pennsylvania, serving for the second part of the 1910 season, replacing J. Troutman Gougler, and compiling a record of 1–3.

References

Year of birth missing
Year of death missing
Dickinson Red Devils football players